This list of fossil fish described in 2018 is a list of new taxa of jawless vertebrates, placoderms, acanthodians, fossil cartilaginous fish, bony fish, and other fish of every kind that are scheduled to be described during the year 2018, as well as other significant discoveries and events related to paleontology of fish that are scheduled to occur in 2018.

Research

 A study on the fossil fish occurrences and habitat during the middle Paleozoic (480 million to 360 million years ago) is published by Sallan et al. (2018), who interpret their findings as indicating that early jawed and jawless fish originated in restricted, shallow intertidal-subtidal environments.
 A survey of Devonian fish fauna from Michigan is published by Stack & Sallan (2018).
 A study on the ecological diversification of thelodonts is published by Ferrón et al. (2018).
 The first occurrence of pelvic girdles and intromittent organs in Euphanerops longaevus, associated with a morphologically differentiated region of the axial skeleton, is reported by Chevrinais et al. (2018).
 A study on the identity of the aspidin (a primitive bone-like tissue of heterostracans) is published by Keating et al. (2018), who interpret aspidin as an acellular dermal bone.
 Redescription of Tesseraspis mosaica is published by Blieck, Elliott & Karatajūtė-Talimaa (2018).
 A study on the morphological and taxonomic diversity of pteraspidiforms is published by Romano, Sansom & Randle (2018).
 A study on the diversity of jaw shapes in modern and Paleozoic jawed fishes, evaluating whether the full extent of jaw morphological variation was established early in gnathostome evolutionary history, is published by Hill et al. (2018).
 New specimens of Brindabellaspis stensioi, providing new information on the morphology of the rostral region of the skull, are described from the Lower Devonian of the New South Wales (Australia) by King, Young & Long (2018).
 Redescription of the antiarch placoderm Asterolepis thule and a study on the age of the deposits preserving the fossils of this species is published by Newman & Den Blaauwen (2018).
 Description of bony pelvic plates in 32 specimens of Bothriolepis canadensis from the Upper Devonian Escuminac Formation (Canada) is published by Charest, Johanson & Cloutier (2018), who reject the interpretation of these structures as genital plates (suggested by Long et al., 2015), and identify them as the pelvic girdle instead.
 Redescription of the antiarch placoderm Phymolepis cuifengshanensis and a study on the phylogenetic relationships of this species is published by Wang & Zhu (2018).
 A study on the morphology of the skull, especially the braincase of the petalichthyid placoderm Shearsbyaspis oepiki is published by Castiello & Brazeau (2018).
 Fossil interpreted as placoderm (arthrodiran) egg cases are described from the Devonian (Famennian) Cleveland Shale (Ohio, United States) by Carr & Jackson (2018).
 Circular or near-circular patterned trace fossils, similar to underwater circles produced by male pufferfishes, are described from the Upper Devonian Hongguleleng Formation (China) by Zong & Gong (2018), who consider it possible that these fossils may be structures made by male fish to attract females.
 Redescription of Gladbachus adentatus and a study on the phylogenetic relationships of the species is published by Coates et al. (2018).
 A study on the wear of a tooth whorl of a specimen of Edestus heinrichi, as well as on its implications for inferring the function of the tooth whorls in this species, is published by Itano (2018).
 New description of Edestus, providing new information on the anatomy of this taxon, is published online by Tapanila et al. (2018).
 Two partial specimens of a callorhynchid chimaeroid left in open nomenclature are described from the Upper Kimmeridgian Nusplingen Plattenkalk (Germany) by Duffin (2018).
 A study on the teeth histology and vasculature of the oldest known tooth-bearing sharks, Leonodus carlsi and Celtiberina maderi, is published by Martinez-Perez et al. (2018).
 The first known basicranium of Carcharopsis wortheni is described from the Carboniferous Fayetteville Shale (United States) by Bronson, Mapes & Maisey (2018).
 A study on the morphology of the braincase of Tristychius arcuatus is published by Coates & Tietjen (2018).
 A diverse fauna of Early Triassic cartilaginous fishes is described from the Vikinghøgda Formation (Spitsbergen, Norway) by Bratvold, Delsett & Hurum (2018).
 The first material referable to hybodont shark (a member of the genus Asteracanthus) is described from the Lower Jurassic (Toarcian) Rosso Ammonitico Formation (Italy) by Romano et al. (2018), providing new information on the dispersal of this genus in the Jurassic Tethys.
 The first scroll coprolites from the Mesozoic reported so far, likely produced by euryhaline hybodontid sharks, are described from the Upper Triassic Tiki Formation of India by Rakshit et al. (2018), who name a new coprolite taxon Tikicopros triassicus.
 Description of new remains of the Late Jurassic shark Palaeocarcharias stromeri and a study on the anatomy and phylogenetic relationships of this species is published by Landemaine, Thies & Waschkewitz (2018), who name a new order Palaeocarchariiformes and a new family Palaeocarchariidae.
 Description of an articulated skeleton of a member of the palaeospinacid genus Synechodus from the Lower Cretaceous (Albian) Saint-Pô Formation (France), and a revision of the taxonomic history of the species assigned to the genus Synechodus, is published by Mollen & Hovestadt (2018).
 Late Cretaceous taxon Platylithophycus cretaceus known from the Niobrara Chalk of Kansas (United States), considered to be a green alga or a cuttlefish in earlier publications, is reinterpreted as a member of Elasmobranchii by Bronson & Maisey (2018).
 A study on the microstructure of enameloid in the isolated teeth of archaeobatid batomorphs Toarcibatis elongata, Cristabatis crescentiformis and Doliobatis weisi from the Jurassic (Toarcian) localities of Halanzy (Belgium) and Ginzebierg (Luxembourg) is published by Manzanares, Botella & Delsate (2018).
 A study on the structure of teeth of Myledaphus pustulosus from the Upper Cretaceous (Maastrichtian) Hell Creek Formation (Montana, United States) is published by Hoffman, Jensen & Hageman (2018).
 Isolated teeth of the sand shark Brachycarcharias lerichei are described from the Eocene (Ypresian) La Meseta Formation (Antarctica) by Marramà et al. (2018), representing the southernmost occurrence of the genus Brachycarcharias reported so far.
 A study on the anatomy, paleobiology and paleoecology of the Eocene requiem shark Eogaleus bolcensis is published by Marramà, Carnevale & Kriwet (2018).
 Teeth of members of the genera Galeorhinus and Physogaleus are described from the Lower Eocene sediments of the Khuiala Formation (Jaisalmer basin, India) by Pandey, Chaskar & Case (2018).
 A study on the teeth mineralization process and teeth histology in extant and fossil members of the genus Hemipristis is published by Jambura et al. (2018).
 A study on the global and regional morphological variation of the teeth of the ground sharks and mackerel sharks across the Cretaceous–Paleogene boundary is published by Bazzi et al. (2018).
 A study on the anatomy and evolution of teeth of members of the families Megachasmidae and Cetorhinidae, based on data from recent and fossil teeth, is published by Mitchell, Ciampaglio & Jacquemin (2018).
 A study on the physiological, ecological and life-history traits which influenced the biogeographic distributions of cartilaginous fishes from the Neogene to the present is published by Villafaña & Rivadeneira (2018).
 A review of the present and past (Miocene–Pleistocene) shark and ray diversity in marine waters of Tropical America is published by Carrillo-Briceño et al. (2018).
 A study on the phylogenetic relationships of extant and fossil squalomorph sharks as indicated by teeth morphology is published by Flammensbeck et al. (2018).
 A study on the morphology and phylogenetic relationships of an early bony fish known from two partial skulls recovered from the Devonian (Emsian) Taemas Limestones of the Burrinjuck area (New South Wales, Australia), possibly belonging to the genus Ligulalepis (described on the basis of isolated scales), is published by Clement et al. (2018).
 Redescription of Elonichthys germari is published by Schindler (2018), who presents the first reconstruction of the skull of this species.
 Redescription of the neotype of the elonichthyid Rhabdolepis macropterus is published by Schindler (2018), who presents new reconstruction of the skull of this species.
 A revision of ray-finned fishes from the Permian locality Buxières-les-Mines (Bourbon-l’Archambault Basin, France) is published by Štamberg (2018).
 A study on the effect of Permian–Triassic and Triassic–Jurassic extinction events on ray-finned fishes is published by Smithwick & Stubbs (2018).
 A study on the evolutionary history of ray-finned fishes across the Cretaceous–Paleogene extinction event, as indicated by isolated fossil teeth preserved in a South Pacific sediment core spanning 72–43 Ma, is published by Sibert et al. (2018).
 A study on the morphological variation of the dorsal finlets in extant bichirs, testing the viability of these anatomic structures as a tool for taxonomic diagnoses in the study of fossil members of this group, is published by Coelho, Cupello & Brito (2018).
 New data on the reproductive biology of the species Saurichthys curionii and Saurichthys macrocephalus from the Middle Triassic Meride Limestone (Monte San Giorgio, Switzerland) is presented by Maxwell et al. (2018), who identify six specimens as unambiguously gravid.
 A study on the internal anatomy of the skulls of two Early Triassic specimens of Saurichthys, as well as on the phylogenetic relationships of saurichthyiforms, is published by Argyriou et al. (2018).
 A comparative study on the bony labyrinth of early neopterygians, including relatives of gars and teleosts, is published by Giles, Rogers & Friedman (2018).
 A study on the diversity of body shapes of neopterygians from the Triassic to the Early Cretaceous is published by Clarke & Friedman (2018).
 Redescription and taxonomic reassessment of the pycnodontiform genus Cosmodus is published by Vullo et al. (2018).
 A study on 52 specimens of Pycnodus from the Eocene Monte Bolca Lagerstätte (Italy), evaluating whether the morphological variability within the sample might be related to inter- or intraspecific variation, is published by Cawley et al. (2018).
 A study on the anatomical structure and possible function of the flank bar-scales of members of Pycnodontiformes is published by Capasso (2018).
 A revision of the phylogenetic relationships of the fossils fishes belonging to the group Halecomorphi is published by Ebert (2018).
 A redescription of Asialepidotus shingyiensis and a study on the phylogenetic relationships of the species is published by Xu & Ma (2018).
 A study on the phylogenetic relationships of the Triassic neopterygian Ticinolepis, as well as on the relationships of the fossil neopterygians in general, is published by López-Arbarello & Sferco (2018).
 A study on the locomotion energetics of Leedsichthys problematicus, possible factors that drove the gigantism in pachycormiforms and the metabolic limits of body size in ray-finned fishes is published by Ferrón et al. (2018).
 An ichthyodectiform fossil specimen preserving a small skull and anterior part of the trunk is described from a core recovered from a well drilled in the Cape Verde Basin, ca. 400km offshore from the West African Atlantic Margin, by Casson et al. (2018).
 A study on the evolutionary history of the family Catostomidae, based on data from molecules, morphology and fossil record, is published by Bagley, Mayden & Harris (2018).
 A study on the phylogenetic relationships of members of Acanthomorpha and on the timescale of the radiation of this group is published by Alfaro et al. (2018), who report that crown ages for five of the six major percomorph subclades, and for the bulk of the species diversity in the sixth, coincide with the Cretaceous–Paleogene boundary.
 A study on the morphology of the skeleton of Pholidophorus latiusculus, as well as on the phylogenetic relationships of this species, is published by Taverne (2018).
 A study on the gill-arch anatomy in Late Cretaceous–early Paleogene members of Aulopiformes is published by Beckett, Giles & Friedman (2018).
 A new specimen of Spinocaudichthys with preserved intestinal tract is described from the Cretaceous (Cenomanian) Jbel Oum Tkout Lagerstätte (Morocco) by Davesne et al. (2018).
 A study on the bone histology of extant opahs, comparing it with bones of their extant and fossil relatives (including "Aipichthys" velifer), and testing the hypothesized link between endothermy and cellular bone (bone containing embedded osteocyte cells) in teleosts, is published by Davesne et al. (2018).
 An articulated skeleton of a juvenile toadfish distinct from Louckaichthys novosadi is described from the Oligocene Bituminous Marls Formation (Romania) by Pikryl et al. (2018).
 A study on the dynamics of diversification, phenotypic evolution and habitat transitions in the ray-finned fish group Carangaria after the Cretaceous–Paleogene extinction event is published by Ribeiro et al. (2018).
 A study on the phylogenetic relationships of the fossil snake mackerels and cutlassfishes from the Eocene (Ypresian) London Clay Formation (United Kingdom) is published by Beckett et al. (2018).
 Detailed description of the caudal skeleton of the Paleogene surgeonfish Arambourgthurus scombrurus is published by Carnevale & Tyler (2018).
 A study on the morphology of the Oligocene percoid fish Oligoserranoides budensis is published by Bieńkowska-Wasiluk & Pałdyna (2018).
 A study on the Pliocene fish fossils from the Kanapoi site (Kenya) and their implications for reconstructing lake and river environments in the Kanapoi Formation is published online by Stewart & Rufolo (2018).
 A metacarpal bone of a specimen of Pteranodon, bearing teeth marks likely produced by a shark and by a saurodontid fish, is described from the Campanian Mooreville Chalk (Alabama, United States) by Ehret & Harrell (2018).
 A series of neck vertebrae of Pteranodon associated with a tooth of the lamniform shark Cretoxyrhina mantelli is described from the Upper Cretaceous Niobrara Formation (Kansas, United States) by Hone, Witton & Habib (2018), who interpret the specimen as evidence of Cretoxyrhina biting Pteranodon.
 A mawsoniid coelacanth specimen is described from Rhaetian deposits of the Var Department (France) by Deesri et al. (2018), representing the first known coelacanth from the marine Triassic of France.
 A study on both newly collected and earlier fossil material of Ventalepis ketleriensis from the Devonian (Famennian) of Latvia and central and northwestern Russia is published by Lebedev & Lukševičs (2018), who interpret the fossils as supporting the porolepiform affinities of this species, and name a new family Ventalepididae.
 Anatomical description of the endocast of "Chirodipterus" australis from the Upper Devonian Gogo Formation (Australia) is published by Henderson & Challands (2018).
 A revision of the lungfish remains from the Triassic of the Świętokrzyskie Mountains and from the northeastern Poland is published by Skrzycki, Niedźwiedzki & Tałanda (2018), who report the first known Middle Triassic finding of Arganodus worldwide and the oldest known occurrence of Ptychoceratodus in Europe.
 Lungfish burrows are reported for the first time from the Lower and Middle Triassic deposits of the Southern Cis-Urals by Sennikov (2018).
 A study on the anatomy of the lungfish Mioceratodus gregoryi from the Eocene Redbank Plains Formation (Australia) is published by Kemp (2018).
 Description of well-preserved pelvic fin skeleton of a specimen of Rhizodus hibberti from the Carboniferous (Viséan) Asbian Wardie Shales (United Kingdom) is published by Jeffery et al. (2018).
 A rediagnosis and redescription of Hyneria lindae based on new remains from the Catskill Formation (Pennsylvania, United States) is published by Daeschler & Downs (2018).

New taxa

Jawless vertebrates

Placoderms

Acanthodians

Cartilaginous fishes

Ray-finned fishes

Lobe-finned fishes

References

2018 in paleontology
2010s in paleontology
2018 in science